New York's 18th State Senate district is one of 63 districts in the New York State Senate. It has been represented by Democrat Julia Salazar since 2019, following her defeat of incumbent Martin Malavé Dilan in the 2018 primary election.

Geography
District 18 is located in northern Brooklyn, including the neighborhoods of Bushwick, Cypress Hills, Greenpoint, Williamsburg, and parts of Bedford-Stuyvesant, Brownsville, and East New York.

The district overlaps with New York's 7th, 8th, and 12th congressional districts, and with the 50th, 53rd, 54th, 55th, 56th, and 60th districts of the New York State Assembly.

Recent election results

2020

2018

2016

2014

2012

Federal results in District 18

References

18